The Imperial Hotel is a hotel on the east side of Russell Square, a branch of Imperial London Hotels.

Former building (1911-1966)

The original building was designed by Charles Fitzroy Doll and built between 1905 and 1911. The height of the building was 61 meters and there were 15 floors. In its opening year it was used by the first all Indian cricket team to tour England.

Physicist Leo Szilard was staying at the Imperial Hotel when he conceived of the atomic bomb.

An extension to the hotel took place in 1913. As part of the extension, Turkish baths were constructed. The hotel had about 640 bedrooms. The building was equally colossal as its neighbour the Kimpton Fitzroy London Hotel and the architectural style was a mixture of Art Nouveau Tudor and Art Nouveau Gothic, combining terra-cotta ornaments in which the corbels, gargoyles and statues were modelled with red brick. Towers rose above a high mansard roof of green copper. A Winter Garden occupied the ground floor between the two bedroom wings. Both Winter garden and Turkish Baths were decorated in glazed Doulton ware.

Demolition of the building started in 1966 and was completed in 1967. It was demolished because of its lack of bathrooms and because, according to the Greater London Council, the whole frame of the building was structurally unsound. There was no possibility of saving it if a preservation order had been placed on the building. In truth, however, the building was probably a victim of fashion and the prevailing taste in the 1960s. All that remains of the building are 21 statues from the Turkish Baths, bells and a galleon, now placed in the courtyard of the current hotel.

Current building
The hotel was replaced by a new building of the same name.

In 2012, Amir Taaki organized the first Bitcoin conference in London at the Imperial Hotel.

See also 
 Constantine v Imperial Hotels Ltd

References

External links 

 

Hotels in London
Demolished hotels in the United Kingdom
Demolished buildings and structures in London
Hotels established in 1911
Hotel buildings completed in 1911
Hotel buildings completed in 1967
Buildings and structures demolished in 1966
Buildings and structures in the London Borough of Camden
Buildings and structures in Bloomsbury